Taghiyev or also Tagiyev is a surname common among Azeris. Its feminine form is Taghiyeva or also Tagiyeva. It is a slavicised version of Taqi with addition of the suffix -yev.

People with the surname:
 Alakbar Taghiyev, an Azerbaijani composer and author of popular Azerbaijani songs. 
 Javid Taghiyev, several people
 Mahmud Taghiyev, an Azerbaijani painter
 Rafig Taghiyev, an Azerbaijani short story writer  
 Sadiq Tagiyev, a Ukrainian Deputy Chairman 
 Taghi Taghiyev, an Azerbaijani painter
 Zeynalabdin Taghiyev, an Azerbaijani national industrial magnate and philanthropist

Azerbaijani-language surnames